Bayard Forrest (born July 8, 1954) is a retired American professional basketball player. He was a 6'10", 235 lb center who played at Grand Canyon University before being drafted by the Seattle SuperSonics in the 1976 NBA draft. Forrest never played for the Sonics, but he played one season for Athletes in Action and two seasons for the Phoenix Suns before retiring in 1980.

College career
Forrest attended Grand Canyon University, a member of the National Association of Intercollegiate Athletics (NAIA). Forrest declined offers from Oregon State University, Arizona State University, and the University of Hawaii because he wanted to go to a Christian school. Forrest lead Grand Canyon to the 1975 NAIA Division I men's basketball tournament, where they defeated Midwestern State University 65–54 in the championship. In the championship game, Forrest had 16 points, 12 rebounds, six assists, and four blocked shots, and was named the tournament's Most Valuable Player. In his four years at Grand Canyon, he averaged 18 points a game and 12.7 rebounds a game, while shooting 53.5% from the field.

Professional career
Forrest was selected in the second round (19th pick overall) in the 1976 NBA Draft by the Seattle SuperSonics. Forrest turned down the Sonics in favor of Athletes in Action and later signed with the Phoenix Suns in 1977. Forrest served as Alvan Adams' back up in 1978 and 1979. The Suns reached the Western Conference Finals in the 1979 NBA Playoffs before falling to the Sonics in seven games. While in Phoenix, Forrest averaged 15.3 minutes a game, 4.1 points a game, 4.2 rebounds a game, and 2.2 assists a game. He retired on June 7, 1980.

Before being drafted by the Sonics, Forrest was drafted by the Phoenix Suns in the 3rd round (54th overall) of the 1975 NBA Draft and by the San Antonio Spurs in the 6th round (56th overall) of the 1975 ABA Draft. He turned down both teams to play his senior season in college.

Personal
Forrest's nephew, Caleb (born 1986), played four years of college basketball at Washington State University.

Notes

External links

1954 births
Living people
American men's basketball players
Basketball players from San Jose, California
Centers (basketball)
Grand Canyon Antelopes men's basketball players
Phoenix Suns draft picks
Phoenix Suns players
San Antonio Spurs draft picks
Seattle SuperSonics draft picks